Led Zeppelin II is the second studio album by the English rock band Led Zeppelin, released on 22 October 1969 in the United States and on 31 October 1969 in the United Kingdom by Atlantic Records. Recording sessions for the album took place at several locations in both the United Kingdom and North America from January to August 1969. The album's production was credited to the band's lead guitarist and songwriter Jimmy Page, and it was also Led Zeppelin's first album on which Eddie Kramer served as engineer.

The album exhibited the band's evolving musical style of blues-derived material and their guitar riff-based sound. It has been described as the band's heaviest album.  Six of the nine songs were written by the band, while the other three were reinterpretations of Chicago blues songs by Willie Dixon and Howlin' Wolf. One single, "Whole Lotta Love", was released outside of the UK (the band would release no UK singles during their career), and peaked as a top-ten single in over a dozen markets around the world.

Led Zeppelin II was a commercial success, and was the band's first album to reach number one on charts in the UK and the US. The album's cover designer David Juniper was nominated for a Grammy Award for Best Recording Package in 1970. On 15 November 1999, the album was certified 12× Platinum by the Recording Industry Association of America (RIAA) for sales passing 12 million copies. Since its release, various writers and music critics have regularly cited Led Zeppelin II as one of the greatest and most influential albums of all time.

Background
Led Zeppelin II was conceived during a busy period of Led Zeppelin's career from January through August 1969, when they completed four European and three American concert tours. Each song was separately recorded, mixed and produced at various studios in the UK and North America. The album was written on tour, during periods of a couple of hours in between concerts, a studio was booked and the recording process begun, necessarily resulting in spontaneity and urgency, which is reflected in the sound. Several songs resulted from improvisation while touring, including during the instrumental sections of "Dazed and Confused", and were recorded mostly live in the studio.

Recording sessions for the album took place at a wide variety of studios in the UK and US, including Olympic and Morgan Studios in London, England; A&M, Quantum, Sunset, Mirror Sound and Mystic Studios in Los Angeles; Ardent Studios in Memphis, Tennessee; A&R, Juggy Sound, Groove and Mayfair Studios in New York City; and R&D Studios. Some of these were ill-equipped, leading to one Vancouver studio, which had an 8-track set-up without even proper headphone facilities, being credited as "a hut". A more favourable set-up was Mystic Studios in Hollywood, Los Angeles with Chris Huston engineering. 

Lead singer Robert Plant later complained that the writing, recording, and mixing sessions were done in many different locations, and criticised the writing and recording process. "Thank You", "The Lemon Song" and "Moby Dick" were overdubbed during the tour, while the mixing of "Whole Lotta Love" and "Heartbreaker" was also done on tour. Page later stated, "In other words, some of the material came out of rehearsing for the next tour and getting new material together."

Page and Kramer spent two days mixing the album at A&R Studios, and the album's production was entirely credited to Jimmy Page, with Eddie Kramer engineering. Kramer was quoted as saying, "The famous Whole Lotta Love mix, where everything is going bananas, is a combination of Jimmy and myself just flying around on a small console twiddling every knob known to man." Kramer later gave great credit to Page for the sound that was achieved, despite the inconsistent conditions in which it was recorded: "We cut some of the tracks in some of the most bizarre studios you can imagine ... but in the end it sounded bloody marvellous ... there was one guy in charge and that was Mr. Page."

Music and lyrics
The finished tracks reflect the evolving sound of the band and their live performances. Plant had his first songwriting credits on Led Zeppelin II; he had been unable to have his contributions to the writing process credited for the first album because of a prior contract with CBS Records.

Side one
"Whole Lotta Love" was built around a five-note Page riff. Parts of the lyrics were taken directly from Willie Dixon's "You Need Love", which led to the group being sued for plagiarism, eventually settling out of court. The arrangement also resembles the Small Faces track "You Need Loving". With basic tracks recorded on Page's houseboat, the middle section of the song contained a variety of overdubbed instruments and vocals which were mixed live by Page and Kramer, making full use of stereo panning and other controls available on the desk. The song was edited down to a single in the US, where it became a top 5 hit. In the UK, a single release was cancelled; the group never issued any singles there during their active career together. It was finally issued as a single in 1997. A mainly instrumental version of the song was recorded by CCS and was used as the theme tune to the BBC TV show Top of the Pops, ensuring it was well known by virtually everyone in Britain.

Led Zeppelin performed "Whole Lotta Love" at every gig from June 1969 onwards. It was the closing number of their live shows between 1970 and 1973, often extended to incorporate a rock'n'roll medley towards the end of the set. A different arrangement of the song was played for the Knebworth Fayre concerts in 1979. It was the last song the group ever performed live with Bonham, on 7 July 1980. "Whole Lotta Love" has since been critically praised as one of the definitive heavy metal tracks, though the group have never considered themselves to fit that specific style.

"What Is and What Should Never Be" was primarily written by Plant. It features a variety of dynamics during the track, along with flanged vocals and wide-panned stereo guitars.

"The Lemon Song" was a re-arrangement of Howlin' Wolf's "Killing Floor", which had become a regular part of the group's live show during 1969. It was mostly recorded live and expanded to include new lyrics, including the sexually-charged phrase "squeeze my lemon" which was borrowed from Robert Johnson's "Travelling Riverside Blues", which the band had played for the BBC radio show Top Gear broadcast on 29 June 1969.

"Thank You" was written by Plant as a love song to his wife, Maureen. Page played twelve-string guitar and Jones played Hammond organ on the track.

Side two
"Heartbreaker" was mostly written by Page as a showcase for his guitar skills, including an unaccompanied solo in the middle of the song. It quickly became a live favourite, being performed regularly from October 1969 onwards, and throughout the group's career.

"Living Loving Maid (She's Just a Woman)" was purported to be written about a groupie the band encountered while touring the US. The group disliked the track, considering it to be little more than filler, and consequently it was never played live by the group. Plant performed the track live on his 1990 solo tour.

"Ramble On" was written by Plant. The lyrics were inspired by J. R. R. Tolkien, and similar themes appeared on subsequent Led Zeppelin albums. The track made good use of dynamics, moving from a quiet acoustic guitar in the opening, to a variety of overdubbed electric guitars towards the end. It was never performed live by Led Zeppelin during their main career, but Plant has performed the song regularly on solo tours, and it was part of Page and Plant's live set in the mid-1990s. It was finally performed live for the first time by Led Zeppelin at the Ahmet Ertegun Tribute Concert in 2007.

"Moby Dick" was designed as a showcase for Bonham's drum solo. It was originally called "Pat's Delight" (after his wife) and features a variety of drums and percussive instruments played with bare hands as well as drumsticks. It was a regular part of Led Zeppelin's live show, developing to include additional percussion and electronic drums.

"Bring It On Home" was a cover of a Willie Dixon song originally performed by Sonny Boy Williamson II. Led Zeppelin's arrangement includes a faster middle section in addition to the straightforward blues structure of the original. It was played live regularly throughout late 1969 and 1970.

Artwork

The album sleeve design was from a poster by David Juniper, who was simply told by the band to come up with an interesting idea. Juniper was a fellow student of Page's at Sutton Art College in Surrey.

Juniper's design was based on a photograph of the Jagdstaffel 11 Division of the German Air Force during World War I, the Flying Circus led by the Red Baron. Juniper replaced four of the flyers' heads with photos of the band members, added facial hair and sunglasses to some of the flyers' faces or replaced some with the faces of other people. The blonde-haired woman is French actress Delphine Seyrig in her role as Marie-Magdalene in the film Mr. Freedom, a leftist anti-war satire by William Klein. The cover also pictured the outline of a Zeppelin on a brown background (similar to the cover of the band's first album), which gave the album its nickname "Brown Bomber".

Release and reception
The album was released on 22 October 1969 on Atlantic Records, with advance orders of 400,000 copies. The advertising campaign was built around the slogans 'Led Zeppelin – The Only Way to Fly' and 'Led Zeppelin II Now Flying'. In the United States, some commercially duplicated reel-to-reel copies of Led Zeppelin II made by Ampex bore the title Led Zeppelin II – The Only Way to Fly on their spine. Commercially, Led Zeppelin II was the band's first album to hit No. 1 in the US, knocking The Beatles' Abbey Road (1969) twice from the top spot, where it remained for seven weeks. By April 1970 it had registered three million American sales, whilst in Britain it enjoyed a 138-week residence on the LP chart, climbing to the top spot in February 1970. Meanwhile, the album reached the top spot in other 5 national albums charts (including Canadian, Australian and Spanish albums charts). In November Ritchie Yorke reported in Billboard that while the album had achieved "staggering" sales, as a hard rock record it was considered unsuitable for North American Top 40 radio stations, who were "dreary and detached from the mainstream of contemporary rock music".

The album also yielded Led Zeppelin's biggest hit, "Whole Lotta Love". This song reached No. 4 on the Billboard Hot 100 in January 1970, after Atlantic went against the group's wishes by releasing a shorter version on 45. The single's B-side, "Living Loving Maid (She's Just a Woman)", also hit the Billboard chart, peaking at No. 65 in April 1970. The album helped establish Led Zeppelin as an international concert attraction, and for the next year, the group continued to tour relentlessly, initially performing in clubs and ballrooms, then in larger auditoriums and eventually stadiums as their popularity grew.

Led Zeppelin II was not well-received by contemporary music critics. John Mendelsohn wrote a negative review of the record for Rolling Stone, in which he mocked the group's heavy sound and white blues, while writing that "until you've listened to the album eight hundred times, as I have, it seems as if it's just one especially heavy song extended over the space of two whole sides". In The Village Voice, Robert Christgau jokingly referred to the band as "the best of the wah-wah mannerist groups, so dirty they drool on demand", while complaining that "all the songs sound alike", before assigning the album a "B" grade. He nonetheless conceded in 1970 that "Led Zeppelin simply out-heavied everyone" the previous year, "pitting Jimmy Page's repeated low-register fuzz riffs against the untiring freak intensity of Robert Plant's vocal. This trademark has only emerged clearly on the second album, and more and more I am coming to understand it as an artistic triumph."

On 10 November 1969, the album was certified gold by the Recording Industry Association of America and in 1990 it was certified 5× platinum reflecting shipping of five million copies. By 14 November 1999, Led Zeppelin II had shipped twelve million copies and was certified 12× platinum by the RIAA.

Legacy and reappraisal

Led Zeppelin II has since been regarded as the quintessential hard rock and heavy metal album. AllMusic editor Stephen Thomas Erlewine said it "provided the blueprint for all the heavy metal bands that followed it". While crediting the band for essentially inventing metal, Tom Hull said that, after the first album had declared their musical ambition, "the second honed it down to a singular entity, a sound", with subsequent albums expanding on it in "sophisticated, subtler, often quite intelligent" ways, but still indebted to "the basic dumbness" of II – "dumb not in the sense of stupid but of non-speaking. Lyrics are there of course, but as an integral part of the music, a music better appropriated tactilely, through incoherent sensation, than intellectually, literarily."

The album was described as a "brilliant if heavy-handed blues-rock offensive", by popular music scholar Ronald Zalkind. According to Robert Santelli's The Big Book of Blues: A Biographical Encyclopedia (2001), Led Zeppelin "had already begun to move beyond its blues-rock influences, venturing into previously unexplored hard-rock territories". Blues-derived songs like "Whole Lotta Love", "Heartbreaker", "The Lemon Song", "Moby Dick", and "Bring It On Home" have been seen as representing standards of the metal genre, where the guitar-based riff (rather than vocal chorus or verses) defines the song and provides the key hook. Such arrangements and emphasis were at the time atypical in popular music. Page's guitar solo in "Heartbreaker" was an influence on later renowned guitarists Eddie Van Halen, as inspiration for his two-handed tapping technique, and Steve Vai.

Since its initial critical reception, Led Zeppelin II has earned several accolades from music publications, frequently ranked on critics' "best album" lists. In 1989, Spin magazine ranked the album No. 5 on its list of The 25 Greatest Albums of All Time. In 1990, CD Review ranked it sixth on their list of top 50 CDs for starting a "pop/rock" library; an accompanying blurb described the album as "white boy blues with a hard rock edge". In 2000, Q magazine placed Led Zeppelin II at number 37 in its list of the 100 Greatest British Albums Ever. In 2003, the album was ranked number 75 on Rolling Stone magazine's list of the 500 greatest albums of all time, 79 in a 2012 revised list, and 123 in a 2020 revised list. The album was also included in the book 1001 Albums You Must Hear Before You Die.

2014 reissue

Along with the group's self-titled debut album and their third album, Led Zeppelin III, the album was remastered and reissued on 2 June 2014. The reissue comes in six formats: a standard CD edition, a deluxe two-CD edition, a standard LP version, a deluxe two-LP version, a super deluxe two-CD plus two-LP version with a hardback book, and as high-resolution, 24-bit/96k digital downloads. The deluxe and super deluxe editions feature bonus material containing alternative takes, backing tracks and the previously unreleased instrumental, "La La". The reissue was released with an altered colour version of the original album's artwork as its bonus disc's cover.

The reissue was met with widespread critical acclaim. At Metacritic, which assigns a normalised rating out of 100 to reviews from mainstream publications, the album received an average score of 95, based on 10 reviews. Pitchfork journalist Mark Richardson said, "the reissue sounds as thrilling as ever", while Julian Marszalek of The Quietus noted the bonus disc's "intriguing insight" into the original record's creation. In Rolling Stone, David Fricke wrote, "the alternate takes highlight Robert Plant's ripening vocal poise and, in a rough mix of 'Ramble On', the decisive, melodic force of John Paul Jones' bass and John Bonham's drumming." "As a two-disc set", Consequence of Sounds Michael Madden wrote, "this reissue is both a reminder of the original album's wallop and a closer look at the alchemy of a band increasingly attuned to ideas of progression." Raoul Hernandez from The Austin Chronicle was more critical of the bonus disc, finding it to be "the thinest of extras" offered by the reissue program.

Track listing

Original release

Notes
Cassette tape releases of the album had "Heartbreaker" ending the first side and "Thank You" starting the second side. On some cassette issues "The Lemon Song" was credited as "Killing Floor".
Original LP pressings of the album incorrectly listed the running time of "Thank You" at 3:50, as the song's coda features a false fade at that point.
 Sides one and two were combined as tracks 1–9 on CD reissues.

Deluxe edition (2014)

Personnel
Led Zeppelin

 John Bonhamdrums, backing vocals
 John Paul Jonesbass guitar, organ, backing vocals
 Jimmy Pageguitars, theremin, backing vocals
 Robert Plantlead vocals, harmonica

Production

 ProducerJimmy Page
 Recording engineers
 George Chkiantz at Olympic Studios, London: "Whole Lotta Love", "What Is and What Should Never Be"
 Chris Huston at Mirror Sound, Los Angeles: "The Lemon Song", "Moby Dick"
 Andy Johns at Morgan Studios, London: "Thank You", "Living Loving Maid (She's Just a Woman)"
 Eddie Kramer at A & R Studios, Juggy Sound Studio, and Atlantic Studios (resp.), New York: "Heartbreaker", "Ramble On", "Bring It On Home"
 Director of engineering and mixing at A & R StudiosEddie Kramer
 LP masteringRobert Ludwig
 Executive producerPeter Grant
 ArtworkDavid Juniper

Digitally remastered editions
 First 1987 CD mastering [19127-2] Barry Diament at Atlantic Studios
 1994 digital remastering (from the original master tapes) Jimmy Page and George Marino at Sterling Sound
 2014 24 bit/192 kHz digital transfers of the original analogue tapes Jimmy Page at Metropolis Mastering, London
 Additional engineering for prev. unreleased studio outtakes Drew Griffiths at Metropolis Mastering, London
 Mastering of prev. unreleased tracks John Davis at Metropolis Mastering, London
 All reissues produced by Jimmy Page

Charts 

Original release

2014 reissue

Year-end charts

Singles

Certifications

See also

List of best-selling albums in the United States
List of Billboard 200 number-one albums of 1970

References
Citations

Sources

External links

1969 albums
Albums produced by Jimmy Page
Atlantic Records albums
Led Zeppelin albums
Albums recorded at Sunset Sound Recorders
Albums recorded at Morgan Sound Studios
Albums recorded at A&M Studios
Albums recorded at Olympic Sound Studios
Albums involved in plagiarism controversies